Nick Auterac (born 12 November 1992 in Westminster, England) is an English professional rugby union player. He plays at prop for Edinburgh Rugby.

Auterac is a Saracens academy graduate. His lack of first team appearances at Saracens between 2011 and 2014 contributed to a 2014 move to Bath. He was a regular starter in Bath's successful 2014–15 English Premiership season. Bath reaching the league playoff final before being defeated by Auterac's former side Saracens. On 14 November 2018 it was revealed that Auterac had agreed terms with Harlequins. Auterac went on to make his Quins debut against former club, Bath, in late October 2018. Playing in the Premiership Rugby Cup.

On 21 January 2020, Auterac signs for Premiership rivals Northampton Saints from the 2020–21 season.

International career 

In June 2021 Auterac was called up to the Scotland squad for the Summer internationals.

References

External links
Premiership Rugby Profile
European Professional Club Rugby Profile

1992 births
Living people
Bath Rugby players
Bedford Blues players
English rugby union players
Harlequin F.C. players
London Scottish F.C. players
Northampton Saints players
People educated at Mill Hill School
Rugby union players from Westminster
Rugby union props
Saracens F.C. players
Edinburgh Rugby players